Tadu-Heba may refer to two queens of Ancient Near East:

 Tadukhipa, daughter of Tušratta, a Mitanni king
 Tadu-Heba, wife of Tudhaliya II, a Hittite king